Ishbia is a surname. Notable people with the surname include:
Jeff Ishbia, founder of United Wholesale Mortgage
Justin Ishbia (born 1977), American billionaire
Mat Ishbia (born 1980), American billionaire